Vibia Sabina (13 August 83–136/137) was a Roman Empress, wife and second cousin once removed to the Roman Emperor Hadrian. She was the daughter of Matidia (niece of Roman Emperor Trajan) and suffect consul Lucius Vibius Sabinus.

Early life 
After her father's death in 84, Sabina, along with her half-sister Matidia Minor, went to live with their maternal grandmother, Marciana. They were raised in the household of Trajan and his wife Plotina.

Sabina married Hadrian in 100, at the empress Plotina's request. Hadrian succeeded her great uncle in 117. Sabina's mother Matidia (Hadrian's second cousin) was also fond of Hadrian and allowed him to marry her daughter.

Empress 
Sabina accumulated more public honors in Rome and the provinces than any imperial woman had enjoyed since the first empress, Augustus’ wife Livia. Indeed, Sabina is the first woman whose image features on a regular and continuous series of coins minted at Rome. She was the most traveled and visible empress to date. In 128, she was awarded the title of Augusta.

Sabina is described in the poetry of Julia Balbilla, her companion, in a series of epigrams on the occasion of Hadrian's visit to Egypt in November of 130. In the poems, Balbilla refers to Sabina as "beautiful" and "lovely."

The Historia Augusta reports that the historian Suetonius, who was Hadrian's secretary, was dismissed by Hadrian from his position in 119, for "conducting [himself] toward his wife, Sabina, in a more informal fashion than the etiquette of the court demanded." Meanwhile, her husband was thought to be more sexually interested in his favourite Antinous and other male lovers, and he and Sabina had no children.

Death 

Vibia Sabina died before her husband, some time in 136 or early 137. There is a strong ancient tradition that Hadrian treated his wife little better than a slave, and may have driven her to suicide. However other sources say he had great respect for her. Hadrian's stone elegy for his wife "depicts the apotheosis, or divine ascent of Sabina in accordance with her posthumous deification on the order of Hadrian."

Temple 
According to researchers, a temple at Elefsina in Greece was dedicated to Sabina.

See also
 Vibia Aurelia Sabina (170-died before 217), great-greatniece to Vibia Sabina

References

Further reading
  L’Harmattan, La vie de Sabine, femme d’Hadrien, in Minaud, Gérard, Les vies de 12 femmes d’empereur romain – Devoirs, Intrigues & Voluptés , Paris, 2012, pp. 169–188.
 Brennan, Corey T., Sabina Augusta: An Imperial Journey, Oxford, 2018, 

83 births
130s deaths
Sabina
1st-century Roman women
2nd-century Roman empresses
Deified Roman empresses
Hadrian
Augustae
Burials at the Castel Sant'Angelo